Rashidi Adewolu Ladoja (born 25 September 1944) is a Nigerian businessman who became governor of Oyo State in Nigeria on 29 May 2003 as a member of the Peoples Democratic Party (PDP). He was impeached in January 2006, but reinstated in December 2006. His term ended in 2007. Ladoja became a member of the Zenith Labour Party (ZLP) in December 2018.

Early life
Ladoja was born on 25 September 1944 in Gambari village near Ibadan. He attended Ibadan Boys High School (1958–1963) and Olivet Baptist High School (1964–1965). He studied at the University of Liège, Belgium (1966–1972) where he earned a degree in Chemical Engineering. He obtained a job with Total Nigeria, an oil company, where he worked for 13 years in various positions before entering private business in 1985. His business interests include Shipping, Manufacturing, Banking, Agriculture and Transportation.
He was elected to the Senate of Nigeria in 1993 during the short-lived Nigerian Third Republic, he was a member of the United Nigeria Congress Party (UNCP) during the Abacha Political Transition.
By 2000, Ladoja had become a director of Standard Trust Bank Limited.

Governor of Oyo State

Ladoja was elected governor of Oyo State in April 2003 on the PDP platform, and took office on 29 May 2003.
He was supported by Alhaji Lamidi Adedibu, a PDP power broker in the state. By August 2004, Ladoja and Adedibu were locked in a fierce struggle over allocation of government appointees.
Ladoja was not supported by the party in this dispute. In an interview in late 2005, the PDP national chairman, Ahmadu Ali, said that Ladoja should take instructions from Lamidi Adedibu.

On 12 January 2006, Ladoja was impeached by Oyo State legislators and forced out of office. His deputy, Christopher Adebayo Alao-Akala, was sworn in as the new governor.
On 1 November 2006, the Appeal Court in the state capital, Ibadan, declared the impeachment null and illegal, but advised waiting for confirmation of this decision by the Supreme Court.
The Supreme Court upheld the decision on 11 November 2006, and Ladajo officially resumed office on 12 December 2006. Anti-riot police were deployed along the main roads leading to the main government offices to prevent violence from supporters of Adebayo Alao-Akala and Lamidi Adedibu during his reinstatement.

Ladoja failed to win the PDP nomination as candidate for a second term. He chose to back the Action Congress candidates for 33 local council chairmanship elections. The PDP refused to participate in the elections. As a result, the Action Congress (AC) won 26 seats and the All Nigeria Peoples Party (ANPP) won seven.
However, his successor as governor, his former deputy and former acting governor Christopher Adebayo Akala, sacked the council chairmen shortly after taking office and replaced them with PDP supporters.

Later career

On 28 August 2008, Ladoja was arrested by the Economic and Financial Crimes Commission (EFCC) over allegations of non-remittance of the proceeds of sale of government shares totaling N1.9 billion during his administration. 
He was briefly remanded in prison by the Federal High Court in Lagos on 30 August 2008. 
He was granted bail on 5 September, in the amount of 100 million naira with two sureties for the same sum. 
In March 2009, a former aide testified on the way on which the share money had been divided between Ladoja's family, bodyguard, senior politicians and lawyers.

Ladoja was the governorship candidate for Accord party in Oyo State during the April 2011 and 2015 elections, he lost to Senator Abiola Ajimobi. He later merged his Accord Party into PDP in 2017. Dispute in PDP made him and other allies (from Labour Party, All Progressives Congress APC etc.) to move over African Democratic Congress (ADC) in 2018. After a brief sojourn in ADC which proved to be a marriage of strange bedfellows, Ladoja with his followers moved to the Zenith Labour Party (ZLP) in December 2018.

References

1944 births
Living people
People from Oyo State
Governors of Oyo State
TotalEnergies people
Peoples Democratic Party state governors of Nigeria
Impeached governors removed from office
University of Liège alumni
Olivet Baptist High School alumni
Yoruba politicians